William Nathaniel Thomas (March 21, 1892 – April 26, 1971) was a US Navy chief of chaplains, described by one historian as "one of the most distinguished Chaplains ever to serve in the US Navy." Born in Mississippi and entering the navy in 1918, he became a rear admiral and was a chief of chaplains of the United States Navy (1945–1949). He served at the United States Naval Academy in Annapolis, Maryland, as an assistant chaplain and then as command chaplain. He wrote the Prayer of the Midshipman and the Dedication in Memorial Hall at the Naval Academy.

Early life and education 
"Will" Thomas, the oldest of seven children, was born March 21, 1892, in Cato, the Piney Woods region of Rankin County, Mississippi. He was one-quarter Choctaw. His father worked for the Finkbine lumber company, moved to D'Lo, Mississippi, and was a founder of the D'Lo Methodist Church. Thomas attended the  D’Lo Methodist church, which was across the street from where he lived. It was there that he got his religious calling. He got his preacher’s license when he was sixteen.

He worked his way through  Millsaps College, a small but recognized institution in Jackson, Mississippi, where he graduated with honors in 1912. His quote in the Millsaps 1912 yearbook reads "To do good rather than be conspicuous." Thomas' ministry began in Danville, Mississippi as he simultaneously served many churches as a rural circuit-rider. He married Martha Ellen Fondren, a member of one of his congregations, on February 18, 1913 when they were both 21 years old. She said "she would never marry a preacher ...but that was before she met Will Thomas."  She accompanied him as he covered his circuit by horse and buggy. He attended Seashore Divinity School from 1913-1915 and was ordained in the Methodist Episcopal Church, South by Bishop J. Atkins on November 28, 1915. He attended the Chicago Theological Seminary in 1926. He was later awarded an honorary Doctor of Divinity from Millsaps College in 1935.

Early career: naval service from World War I until the Naval Academy duty 1933 
When America entered World War I in 1917, he went to Washington to join the army, which didn’t need chaplains, so he was referred to the navy. He had never seen a naval officer. He served aboard the USS Madawaska from February 1918 to September 1919. He said that, when signing up as a navy chaplain, he was asked whether he wanted to be in the regular navy or the reserve and he chose the former. When World War I was over, he planned to return to civilian ministry but was informed that, as a member of the regular navy, he was obliged to remain aboard the transport as it brought soldiers back, so he crossed the Atlantic a total of 28 times. Thomas soon found that he loved the navy, its people and all of his subsequent assignments.

His first shore duty, from September 1919 to February 1922, was at the US Public Service Hospital, Fort Lyon, Colorado, which had formerly served as a tuberculosis hospital.  Many of the patients there had been gassed in the war. He was commissioned as a lieutenant on November 3, 1920. He then served aboard  from February 1922 to July 1924.

Thomas' first tour at the Naval Academy was as assistant chaplain from 1924 to 1927 under Chaplain Sidney K. Evans, who later became Chief of Chaplains from 1929 to 1935. In addition to regular duties, he held services on the  that was docked at the Academy and used as a disciplinary barracks. He was promoted to lieutenant commander November 2, 1924 and then commander November 3, 1924. It had been said that "He had prayed over and for more foreign dignitaries, of every shape, dress, nationality and race than any other Navy Chaplain." His next tour was as the chaplain of the 14th Naval District at Pearl Harbor, Hawaii, from November 1929 to July 1932. His final sea duty, from July 1932 to May 1933,  was aboard the  during the Great Depression.

Senior Chaplain of the United States Naval Academy 

The highlight of Thomas’ career was at the Naval Academy as Command Chaplain from June 1933 to June 1945 when so many became acquainted with him as midshipmen, instructors, administrative staff and students at the Naval Postgraduate School. His twelve-year tenure at the Academy was unprecedented.

For many years the authorship of The Midshipman Prayer was unknown. In 1938 Thomas wrote the prayer at the request of some Midshipmen. It is said to encompass much of his theology and his ideal of a Naval Officer.  He never sought credit for the prayer. It has been used at Divine Service in the Naval Academy Chapel ever since. A bronze plaque of the prayer resides in the chapel.

While at the academy, he performed 800 weddings and 700 baptisms.  At graduation time he often had services 30 minutes apart as he alternated between the upper and lower chapels. His duties included the Academy's Christian Association. He also addressed many civic associations, graduations, and regularly entertained midshipmen in their home as Command Chaplain.

He oversaw the enlargement of the Academy Chapel, referred to as the  “Cathedral of the Navy.”  The nave was extended by a thousand seats converting the design of the Chapel from a Greek to a Latin cross with 2500 seats. He replaced the cannons with anchors on the Chapel entrance believing "that religion should be the anchor of a naval officer's life".  A new pulpit was created and a votive ship installed. The completed Chapel was re-dedicated on April 28, 1940 with Thomas presiding.  He was instrumental in bringing the Jewish clergy to the Academy.

He brought to the pulpit of the Academy some of the finest ministers in America: Dean Luther Weigle, Peter Marshall and Ralph Sockman. On December 7, 1941 Peter Marshall, visiting minister from the New York Presbyterian Church of Washington, D.C.  asked Thomas if he might change his announced topic. Peter Marshall then delivered a most famous sermon, "Rendezvous in Samarra"  about death and immortality to the assembled regiment of Midshipmen. After chapel all were to learn of the attack on Pearl Harbor. Before his sermons, Thomas would honor the members of the Naval Academy graduates who had died in service. In 1943 he received an honorary Doctor of Divinity from American University in Washington, D.C.

After the war 
He was one of 39 chaplains to serve in both World War I and World War II. Thomas would have preferred remaining at the Naval Academy but became the seventh chief of chaplains in Washington, D.C., on July 1, 1945. He held commission Number One as rear admiral of the upper half in the Chaplain Corps but preferred to be addressed as "Chaplain", maintaining that "the title of admiral properly belonged to a lord of the sea."  He much preferred his professional life, being first a minister and second a naval officer, to an administrative position.

After the surrender of Japan, President Truman asked Thomas and the Army Chief of Chaplains, Luther D. Miller, to conduct a service of thanksgiving at the White House.

At the end of the War, Beginning with a Corps of 2811 chaplains, Thomas effectively oversaw the demobilization and discharge of chaplains. He had "civil readjustment" chaplains assigned to centers so chaplain dischargees could talk with a chaplain before leaving the service. He oversaw the creation of many chapels, many at closed naval installations, with the support of the Chief of Naval Operations and President Truman with the three major faith groups represented. These were available to church groups in the local civilian community.

Thomas brought completion to the first historical volumes of the Chaplain Corps. District chaplains were given added prominence and the first District Chaplains Conference was held in 1946. Under the leadership of Thomas, the first official  manual ever issued for the use of the Chaplain Corps was issued was in August 1947. He helped formalize post-graduate studies for chaplains. It is thought that the circuit riding chaplaincy ministry on destroyers was based on Thomas having been a circuit rider in Mississippi. In January 1947 Thomas was awarded the Legion of Merit.

In 1952 Thomas wrote the Dedication in Memorial Hall  in Bancroft Hall of the US Naval Academy that was placed beneath the "Dont Give up the Ship" flag.

Retirement 
Thomas retired from active duty in 1949. Upon retirement he and Mrs. Thomas moved to Lake Junaluska Methodist Assembly near Waynesville, North Carolina, where he resided until his death. He served as dean of the Memorial Chapel at Lake Junaluska. He preached in many of the local churches. When asked if he had any difficulties serving the different denominations, he said, "Not at all. I dehydrated the Baptists, thawed out the Presbyterians and quieted down the shouting Methodists." He was active in civic affairs and belonged to a large number of both military and civilian organizations. Frequently in demand as a speaker, his most popular speech was "The Definition of a Gentleman." He pursued his lifelong interests in golf, reading, gardening, woodworking, and performing weddings.  He said, "He would prefer to tee off on the golf course than to do it at people." He suffered two strokes in his last days and died April 26, 1971 at the age of 79.

Personal life 
Thomas was married to Martha Ellen Fondren (1892–1990) on February 18, 1913. They had two children both of whom  served in the US Navy.

William Nathaniel Thomas Jr. (1919–2013)  was a 1942 medical graduate from University of Virginia, Charlottesville. In October 1943 he received his naval commission, attained the rank of lieutenant in the medical corps and was wounded on Okinawa as a battalion surgeon with the first Marine Division. After the war he became a radiologist in Annapolis, Maryland.

John Edward Thomas (1930–1993) graduated from University of Virginia, Charlottesville, with a degree in psychology. He entered the navy in 1952 and served for three years during the Korean War. He attained the rank of lieutenant junior grade and was an executive ship officer.

Death 
Thomas had requested a simple funeral.  There was a memorial service at the United States Naval Academy Chapel in Annapolis.  He is buried on Chaplains Hill at Arlington National Cemetery, Virginia, where he was joined by his wife in 1990.

He is to have said, "A Chaplain's personal life is his most effective sermon." In 1980 the walk encircling the Naval Academy Chapel was named in his honor.

Honors and awards 

 Victory Medal with Transport Clasp
 American Defense Campaign Service Ribbon
 American Area Campaign Ribbon
 Victory Medal, WWII
 Legion of Merit  1947
 Honorary Doctor of Divinity  from the Millsaps College in 1935.
 Honorary Doctor of Divinity from American University in 1943

Notable works and legacy 

 The Prayer of a Midshipman in 1938
 The Dedication in Memorial Hall at the US Naval Academy
 Thomas Walk encircling the USNA Chapel

Citations 

1892 births
1971 deaths
People from Rankin County, Mississippi
American people of Choctaw descent
Millsaps College alumni
American Methodist clergy
United States Navy chaplains
Military personnel from Mississippi
United States Navy personnel of World War I
United States Navy personnel of World War II
Chiefs of Chaplains of the United States Navy
Recipients of the Legion of Merit
United States Navy admirals
People from Haywood County, North Carolina
Burials at Arlington National Cemetery
20th-century American clergy